Pui Pui or Pui-Pui may refer to:
Pui Pui (crocodile), in Hong Kong Wetland Park
Pui-Pui (Dragon Ball), a Dragon Ball character
Pui Pui Molcar, an anime television series
Pui–Pui Protection Forest, in Peru